The Shadow Economic Secretary to the Treasury is a position in the Official Opposition frontbench.

The shadow minister is the opposite number to the Economic Secretary to the Treasury, holding them and the Treasury to account. Led by the Shadow Chancellor of the Exchequer and the Shadow Chief Secretary to the Treasury, they are a junior opposition spokesperson for the Treasury.

List of shadow ministers

External links 

 Guide to UK Policy Shapers and Influencers 2014
 Labour Shadow Team: HM Treasury

References 

Official Opposition (United Kingdom)
HM Treasury
2010 establishments in the United Kingdom